Herti Kirchner (3 September 1913 – 1 May 1939) was a German actress. She appeared in twenty-five films between 1932 and 1939.

Selected filmography
 Eight Girls in a Boat (1932)
 Gretel Wins First Prize (1933)
 Pappi (1934)
 The Mysterious Mister X (1936)
 Who's Kissing Madeleine? (1939)
 The Leghorn Hat (1939)

References

External links

1913 births
1939 deaths
German film actresses
Actors from Kiel